Aerangis ellisii is a species of epiphytic orchid. It is native to Madagascar .

References

ellisii
Endemic flora of Madagascar
Epiphytic orchids